Stomp may refer to:
Stomp (strike), a downwards kick using the heel

Music and dance
Stomp (album), by Big D and the Kids Table, 2013
Stomp (jazz), a type of rhythmic jazz tune popular in the 1920s
Stomp (theatrical show), a percussive physical theatre troupe
Stomp dance, a Native American dance
Stomp Records, a record label now part of Union Label Group

Songs
"Stomp!" (Brothers Johnson song)
"Stomp" (God's Property song)
"Stomp" (Steps song)
"Stomp", a song by Young Buck from Straight Outta Cashville
"Stomp", a song by Wilson Pickett
Stompa (song), a song by Serena Ryder

Other uses
 Stomp!, a board wargame
Straits Times Online Mobile Print, a Singapore-based web portal
Streaming Text Oriented Messaging Protocol, a protocol for working with message-oriented middleware
WWF S.T.O.M.P., a line of Jakks action figures based on World Wrestling Federation (now World Wrestling Entertainment) wrestlers

See also 
 Stomping, a musical technique